The following elections occurred in the year 2014.

 2014 United Nations Security Council election 16 October 2014

Africa
 2014 Algerian presidential election 17 April 2014
 2014 Botswana general election 24 October 2014
 2014 Comorian presidential election 21 February and 10 April 2014
 2014 Egyptian presidential election 26–28 May 2014
 2014 Egyptian constitutional referendum 14–15 January 2014
 2014 Guinea-Bissau general election 13 April and 18 May 2014
 2014 Libyan Constitutional Assembly election 20 February 2014
 2014 Malawian general election 20 May 2014
 2014 Mauritanian presidential election 21 June 2014
 2014 Mozambican general election 15 October 2014
 2014 Namibian general election 28 November 2014
 2014 São Tomé and Príncipe legislative election 12 October 2014
 2014 South African general election 7 May 2014
 2014 Tunisian parliamentary election 26 October 2014
 2014 Tunisian presidential election 23 November and 21 December 2014

Asia
 2014 Afghan presidential election 5 April and 14 June 2014
 2014 Bangladeshi general election 5 January 2014
 2014 Indonesian legislative election 9 April 2014
 2014 Indonesian presidential election 9 July 2014
 2014 Indian general election 7 April to 12 May 2014
 2014 North Korean parliamentary election 9 March 2014
 2014 Taiwanese municipal elections 29 November 2014
 2014 South Korean local elections 4 June 2014
 2014 Syrian presidential election 3 June 2014

Europe
 2014 Belgian federal election 25 May 2014
 2014 Belgian regional elections 25 May 2014
 2014 Bosnian general election 12 October 2014
 2014 Bulgarian parliamentary election 5 October 2014
 2014 Czech Senate election 10-11 and 17–18 October 2014
 2014 Czech municipal elections 10–11 October 2014
 2014 Dutch municipal elections 19 March 2014
 2014 French Senate election 28 September 2014
 2014 Georgian local elections 15 June 2014
 2014 Hungarian parliamentary election 6 April 2014
 2014 Lithuanian presidential election 11 and 25 May 2014
 2014 Moldovan parliamentary election 30 November 2014
 2014 Romanian presidential election 2 and 16 November 2014
 2014 Serbian parliamentary election 16 March 2014
 2014 Slovak presidential election 15 and 29 March 2014
 2014 Swedish general election 14 September 2014
 2014 Turkish local elections 30 March and 1 June 2014
 2014 United Kingdom local elections 22 May 2014
 2014 Ukrainian parliamentary election 26 October 2014
 2014 Ukrainian presidential election 25 May 2014
 2014 Kyiv local election 25 May 2014

European Parliament
 2014 European Parliament election 22–25 May 2014

San Marino
 2014 Sammarinese local elections 30 November 2014

North America

Canada
 2014 New Brunswick general election 22 September 2014
 2014 Ontario municipal elections 27 October 2014
 2014 Ontario general election 12 June 2014
 2014 Quebec general election 7 April 2014

Costa Rica
 2014 Costa Rican general election 2 February 2014

Panama
 2014 Panamanian general election 4 May 2014

United States
 2014 United States elections 4 November 2014
 2014 United States Senate elections 4 November 2014
 2014 United States House of Representatives elections 4 November 2014
 2014 United States gubernatorial elections 4 November 2014

South America

Brazil
 2014 Brazilian general election 5 and 26 October 2014

Colombia
 2014 Colombian parliamentary election 9 March 2014
 2014 Colombian presidential election 25 May and 15 June 2014

Uruguay
 2014 Uruguayan general election 26 October 2014

Oceania

Australia
 2014 South Australian state election 15 March 2014
 2014 Victorian state election 29 November 2014
 2014 Tasmanian state election 15 March 2014

Fiji
 2014 Fijian general election 17 September 2014

New Zealand
 2014 New Zealand general election 20 September 2014

Tonga
 2014 Tongan general election 27 November 2014

See also
 List of next general elections

 
Elections
2014